Katpadi taluk is a taluk in Vellore district of the Indian state of Tamil Nadu. The headquarters of the taluk is the town of Katpadi.

Demographics
According to the 2011 census, the taluk of Katpadi had a population of 387,922 with 193,853 males and 194,069 females. There were 1,001 women for every 1,000 men. The taluk had a literacy rate of 74.58%. Child population in the age group below 6 was 18,402 Males and 17,728 Females.

References 

 India Study Channel

Taluks of Vellore district